The Northeast New York PGA Championship is a golf tournament that is the championship of the Northeast New York section of the PGA of America.  Armand Farina, World War II veteran and golf course designer, holds the record for most victories with five. Gene Sarazen, winner of 39 PGA Tour events and seven major championships, won the Northeast New York PGA Championship in 1966 at the age of 64.

Winners 

 2022 Justin Hearley
 2021 Scott Berliner
 2020 Scott Berliner
 2019 Scott Berliner
 2018 Kyle Kressler
 2017 Jim Jeffers
 2016 Eric Mabee
 2015 Scott Berliner
 2014 Scott Berliner
 2013 Frank Mellet
 2012 Scott Berliner
 2011 Scott Berliner
 2010 Frank Mellet
 2009 Anders Mattson
 2008 Josh Hillman
 2007 Josh Hillman
 2006 Jim Jeffers
 2005 Rocky Catalano
 2004 Steve Vatter
 2003 Jim Marston
 2002 Dal Daily
 2001 Dal Daily
 2000 Dal Daily
 1999 Dal Daily
 1998 Jim Jeffers
 1997 Bob Ackerman
 1996 Peter Gerard
 1995 Paul Daniels
 1994 Jim Jeffers
 1993 Rick Pohle
 1992 Paul Daniels
 1991 David Nevatt
 1990 Peter Baxter
 1989 Dan Spooner
 1988 David Nevatt
 1987 Tom Smack
 1986 Harvey Bostic, Sr.
 1985 John Taylor
 1984 Harvey Bostic, Sr.
 1983 Jack Polanski
 1982 Ralph Montoya
 1981 Dave Philo
 1980 John Wells
 1979 John Maurycy
 1978 Ralph Montoya
 1977 Lou Merkle
 1976 Jay Morelli
 1975 Ron Philo
 1974 Rudy Goff
 1973 Bob Haggerty
 1972 Lou Merkle
 1971 Ed Bosse
 1970 John Maurycy
 1969 Bob Mix
 1968 Bob Mix
 1967 Ronnie Matson
 1966 Gene Sarazen
 1965 Alex Sinclair
 1964 Ed Kroll
 1963 Dan Williams, Jr.
 1962 Charley Shepard
 1961 Alex Sinclair
 1960 Bob Mix
 1959 Alex Sinclair
 1958 Art Stuhler
 1957 Art Stuhler
 1956 Alex Sinclair
 1955 Armand Farina
 1954 George Morrison
 1953 Armand Farina
 1952 Jim Farina
 1951 Armand Farina
 1950 Frank Stuhler
 1949 Milan Murasic
 1948 Milan Murasic
 1947 Milan Murasic
 1946 Armand Farina
 1945 Armand Farina

References

External links
PGA of America – Northeast New York section
2014 Membership Directory: Award History

Golf in New York (state)
PGA of America sectional tournaments
Recurring sporting events established in 1945
1945 establishments in New York (state)